Louis Douglass may refer to:

 Louis Douglas (1889–1939), American dancer, choreographer, and music businessman
 Louis R. Douglass (1888–1979), American civil engineer